Funen, with an area of , is the third-largest island of Denmark, after Zealand and Vendsyssel-Thy. It is the 165th-largest island in the world. It is located in the central part of the country and has a population of 469,947 as of 2020. Funen's main city is Odense, which is connected to the sea by a seldom-used canal. The city's shipyard, Odense Steel Shipyard, has been relocated outside Odense proper.

Funen belongs administratively to the Region of Southern Denmark. From 1970 to 2006 the island formed the biggest part of Funen County, which also included the islands of Langeland, Ærø, Tåsinge, and a number of smaller islands.

Funen is linked to Zealand, Denmark's largest island, by the Great Belt Bridge, which carries both trains and cars. The bridge is in reality three bridges; low road and rail bridges connect Funen to the small island of Sprogø in the middle of the Great Belt, and a long road suspension bridge (the second longest in the world at the time of opening) connects Funen the rest of the way to Zealand, paralleled by a rail tunnel.

Two bridges connect Funen to the Danish mainland, Jutland. The Old Little Belt Bridge was constructed in the 1930s, shortly before World War II for both cars and trains. The New Little Belt Bridge, a suspension bridge, was constructed in the 1970s and is used for cars only.

Apart from the main city, Odense, all major towns are located in coastal areas. Beginning in the north-east of the island and moving clockwise, they are Kerteminde (NE), Nyborg (E), Svendborg (S), Fåborg (SW), Assens (W), Middelfart (NW) and Bogense (N).

The populations of the major cities and towns are, as of 1 January 2018:

 Odense: 178,210
 Svendborg: 27,324
 Nyborg: 17,164
 Middelfart: 15,246
 Fåborg: 7,065
 Assens: 6,209
 Kerteminde: 5,914
 Ringe: 5,912
 Otterup: 5,227
 Bogense: 3,891

Funen was the birthplace of Hans Christian Andersen, the composer Carl Nielsen, American War of Independence combatant Christian Febiger, pop singer MØ and international footballer Christian Eriksen.

The highest natural point on Funen is Frøbjerg Bavnehøj.

Politics 
Funen (Folketing constituency)

Viking Age
In 2018, at the highest point in Funen, known as Munkebo Bakke, the archaeologists have found a giant Viking hall that dates back more than 1.000 years, to around 825 – 1.000 CE.
According to the Funen museum experts, this Viking hall is bigger than anything found on Funen before.

Galgedil is a Viking Age cemetery located in the northern part of Funen. Excavations at the local site revealed 54 graves containing 59 inhumations and 2 cremation burials.

See also

 Broholm
 Den Selvforsynende Landsby
 Egeskov Castle
 Fynske Livregiment
 Horne Church
 Hvedholm Castle
 Korshavn, Denmark
 Skrøbelev Gods
 The Funen Village an open-air museum.
 Funen brachteate in the collections of the National Museum of Denmark.

References

External links
Official tourist information site for Funen

 
Islands of Denmark
Region of Southern Denmark